The Sega Genesis Mini, known as the Mega Drive Mini in regions outside of North America, is a dedicated console modeled on the Sega Genesis. The Mini emulates the original console's 16-bit hardware, and includes 42 games made available through emulation software by M2. It was released in North America and Japan in September 2019 and in Europe and the Middle East in October 2019. A follow-up, Sega Genesis Mini 2, was released in October 2022 and includes 53 games from the Genesis and Sega CD.

Hardware and accessories
The Mini is half the size of the original Sega Genesis. Inside the unit is an ARM-based SOC ZUIKI Z7213 and 512 MB of flash memory. It includes either one or two (dependent on region's bundle options) full-size replica controllers that connect through USB (thus original controllers are incompatible), a USB-to-Micro-B power cable (USB AC adapter in North America), and an HDMI video cable. There are separate releases for North America, Europe, Asia and Japan, as the Mini reproduces the original console's decal and color variations in those regions. Korea is a slight exception, as the Mega Drive was released there by Samsung as the Super Gam*Boy and Super Aladdin Boy; none of these names appear on the Korean Mini.

All of the games have a save state feature to pause and resume progress and can be played in either the original 4:3 aspect ratio with optional wallpapers or stretched to 16:9 widescreen with HUD elements modified to fit onto the screen. Certain games have regional variants that can be accessed by changing the system's language settings (e.g. switching the system language from English to Japanese will change Dr. Robotnik's Mean Bean Machine into Puyo Puyo.)

The North American and European models of the Genesis Mini come bundled with two three-button controllers, while the Japanese model comes with two six-button controllers. Officially licensed six-button controllers made specifically for the Mini are also sold separately in North America and Europe. Official model accessories of a miniature Mega-CD, a miniature Super 32X, a miniature Sonic & Knuckles lock-on Genesis cartridge, and a miniature Sonic the Hedgehog standard Mega Drive cartridge were also sold separately in Japan.  Miniature replicas of the Sega CD and Sega 32X in both the North American and European versions were also manufactured but only distributed to select members of the media.

The Mini 2 system is modeled after the Mega Drive 2 variant of the original console and comes bundled with over 50 games and a single six-button controller in all regions. It uses the same SOC chip as the first Mini, albeit with more memory and storage. In addition to the first Mini's emulation features, the Mini 2 includes the option to emulate the sound outputs of the original Genesis or Genesis 2. Like with the original Mega Drive Mini, a set of model accessories consisting of a miniature Mega-CD 2, a miniature Virtua Racing cartridge, and a miniature Sonic CD disc was released in Japan alongside the system, including compatibility parts with the first Mega Drive Mini and its accessories. Additionally, a USB-powered Cyber Stick controller based on the original flight stick controller produced by Sharp was released alongside the system in Japan and provides analog input for After Burner II, Night Striker, and Starblade.

Games

Sega Genesis Mini
The Sega Genesis Mini features 40 Sega Genesis games, with the selection varying depending on the region. In addition to these titles, the game includes two bonus games, Darius and Tetris, which are new conversions made for the Mini system that were previously never released for the original console.

Sega Genesis Mini 2
The Sega Genesis Mini 2 features 53 games released for both the Genesis and the Sega CD add-on peripheral. Like the original Mini, the Mini 2 also features seven additional games that were never released for the Genesis, including both unreleased games and new arcade ports.

Production and release 
The Sega Genesis Mini was first announced at the Sega Fes show in April 2018. The announcement was part of a trend of releasing smaller versions of retro video game consoles. It was delayed in September, missing the console's 30th-anniversary window, when Sega dropped its partnership with AtGames, whose 2017 Sega Genesis Flashback was critically panned for its production quality. Instead of using AtGames's Flashback software on a Japan-exclusive Mini, Sega handled the entire production of the system. The system was released worldwide on September 19, 2019, except in Europe and the Middle East, where it was delayed until October 4, 2019, due to distribution issues.

M2, who previously collaborated with Sega on the Sega Ages and Sega 3D Classics Collection series, produced the Mini's ports. Sega emphasized first-party production quality in its marketing for the Mini, as the company returns to the hardware business after last producing the Sega Dreamcast in 2001. The menu music was written by Yuzo Koshiro, who was also the composer of the compilation's Beyond Oasis, Streets of Rage 2, and The Revenge of Shinobi.

Since its release, the first Sega Genesis Mini console had sold over 300,000 units by the end of March 2020.

A followup, the Sega Genesis Mini 2, was announced on June 3, 2022 and was released worldwide on October 27, 2022. Koshiro returned to write the menu music.

Notes

References

External links 
 
 

Dedicated consoles
Products introduced in 2019
Sega Genesis
Linux-based video game consoles
ARM-based video game consoles
Retro style